Płytnica may refer to:

Płytnica, Piła County, Poland
Płytnica, Złotów County, Poland